Kururu may refer to:

Anime 
 Kururu Sumeragi, a character in the Air Gear series
 Sergeant Major Kururu (Kululu in English dub), a character in the Sgt. Frog series
 Kururu, a fairy in the 2003 anime Bottle Fairy series

Video games 
 Kururu, a character in the 1998 PlayStation Rhapsody: A Musical Adventure game
 Kururu, the main character in 2000 PlayStation Little Princess: Marl Ōkoku no Ningyō Hime 2 game

Web comics 
 Kururu, a character in the Brazilian webcomic Combo Rangers

th:สิบเอกคุรุรุ